Joshua Caleb Smith, who goes by Joshua C.S.,  is an American songwriter, recording artist and musician. He was the vocalist on "Our Time Will Come", nominated for an Emmy Award in 2012 (Outstanding Original Score in a Drama Series).  The song was showcased in 2011 on the show The Young and the Restless. In 2009, he founded the artist collective True Source Entertainment.

Professional life
Smith lived and worked in Los Angeles, California from 2005 to 2012. Currently he lives and works in Nashville as a recording artist, songwriter, and producer of music, video and other creative projects under True Source Entertainment, a "creative collective". In 2012 he opened an advertising and marketing agency called Plan Left with his brother Matthew Smith.  He records and performs under the artist name, "Joshua" or "Joshua C.S." and when performing with a band, "Joshua and the Bandits" of which the line-up changes regularly.

His first record release under the band name, "Stereofox" was recorded in Los Angeles, by Gary Novak (drummer and recording professional) and produced by Deron Johnson (keyboardist, producer, multi-instrumentalist). His first independent EP under the name, "Listen | Joshua" has been released through Bandcamp in 2012 with True Source Entertainment and now iTunes in 2013 and was produced by Deron Johnson with the help of Andrea Remanda (under the name, "DANDA 1 Productions").

Discography

Singles & EPs
 Joshua EP (2011) – promotional limited release
 Listen (2012) by Joshua – released on Bandcamp
 Listen and Joshua were later released as a double EP
 Love and War EP.1 (TSE, 2014) by Joshua and the Bandits
 Milk and Honey Tapes Vol.1 (TSE, 2018) by Joshua C.S.
 Milk and Honey Tapes Vol.2 (TSE, 2018) by Joshua C.S.

Albums
 Ice the Symphony (Ecco Bravo Music Group, 2009) by Stereofox
 Roots (TSE, 2017)
 Live at Hendershot's in Athens GA (TSE, 2017)

Collaborations and other songs
 "Our Time Will Come" (TSE, 2012) by Joshua
 "Butter Song" (TSE, 2012) – limited release single for the 2011 film Butter by The Weinstein Company
 Pennhurst: Asylum of the Dead soundtrack  (TSE, 2012) – film directed by Michael Rooker Film score
 "Cold As Ice" (Color Red, 2021) by Lamar Williams Jr. (written by Joshua C.S. and Lamar Williams Jr.)

References

External links
 

1984 births
Living people
Musicians from Tennessee